Tiarna Molloy is an Australian rugby union player. She plays for the Queensland Reds in the Super W competition.

Molloy was named in Australia's squad for the 2022 Pacific Four Series in New Zealand. She made her international debut for the Wallaroos against the United States on 12 June in West Auckland.

References 

Year of birth missing (living people)
Living people
Australia women's international rugby union players
Australian female rugby union players
21st-century Australian women